Plamthottathil Gangadharan Viswambharan  (1947 – 16 June 2010) was an Indian film director who worked in Malayalam cinema. Viswambharan directed  63 Malayalam films, in a career spanning close to four decades.

Career 
For a decade, P. G. Viswambharan worked with veteran Sasikumar before turning a full-fledged director in 1976 with Ozhukkinethire. He is one of the top directors with most number of movies to his credit in the Malayalam Cinema industry  He directed 63 movies independently until his death in 2010. He was the director of Mammootty's first action political entertainer movie Sphotanam which was vital in the carrier of Mammootty in making a space in Malayalam film industry, Satyavan Savithri starring  Kamal Haasan and Sridevi, Sandhyakku Virinja Poovu, Ee Sabdam Innathe Sabdam, Kattukuthira, Gajakesari Yogam, Carnival, Ezhupunna Tharakan, were some of his notable movies. The 2002 movie Puthooram puthri Unniyarcha was his last. Many of his movies have been dubbed to Tamil, Telugu and Kannada.  He has also been elected as the vice-chairman of MACTA ( Malayalam cine technicians association ) for a period of five years.P.G. Viswambharan is one of the few directors in Malayalam to cross the mark of 50 independent movies with 63 movies to his credit. He has worked with all the major actors and technicians of the industry and has worked with Mammootty in 23 of his films. Kamal Haasan, Amjad Khan & Sridevi are a few of the other notable personalities he has cast successfully in his movies. He was specially mentioned by BBC India for his contributions to Malayalam cinema. He has won several awards including the prestigious film critics award.

Personal life
Viswambharan was born in 1947 to Karichchal Plamthottam Gangadhara Panicker and Ponni Amma. He died on 16 June 2010 at P.V.S. Hospital in Kochi.

Filmography
 Puthooramputhri Unniyarcha (2002) (Vaniviswanath, Kunjako Boban)
 Ezhupunna Tharakan (1999) (Mammootty)
 Glorya Fernandes from USA (1998)
 Suvarna Simhaasanam (1997) (Sureshgopi, Mukesh, Renjitha)
 Parvathy Parinayam (1995) (Mukesh, Annie)
 Dhadha (1994) (Babu Antony, Santhikrishna)
 Aagneyam (1993) (Jayaram, Sunitha, Maathu, Gouthami)
 Pravachakan (1993) (Mukesh, Lalitha)
 Vakkeel Vasudev (1993) (Jayaram, Sunitha, Jagadeesh)
 First Bell (1992) (Jayaram, Jagadish, Geetha Vijayan)
 Ennathe Programme (1991)
 Irrikku M.D. Akathudu (1991) (Sunitha, Mukesh, Saikumar)
 Gajakesariyogam (1990) (Innocent, K. P. A. C. Lalitha, Mukesh, Sunitha)
 Kattukuthira (1990) (Thilakan, Vineeth, Anju)
 Carnival (1989) (Mamootty)
 Oru Vivaada Vishayam (1988)
 Simon Peter Ninakku Vendi (1988)
 Itha Samayamayi (1987)
 Ponnu (1987)
 Aval Kathirunnu Avanum (1986)
 Nandi Veendum Varika (1986)
 Prathyekam Sradhikuka (1986)
 Ithile Iniyum Varu (1986)
 Ee Lokam Ivide Kure Manushyar (1985)
 Ee Sabdam Innathe Sabdam (1985)
 Ee Thanalil Ithiri Neram (1985)
 Ivide Ee Theerathu (1985)
 Onnanu Nammal (1984)
 Oru Kochukatha Aarum Parayatha Katha (1984)
 Sandhyakenthinu Sindooram (1984)
 Thirakil Alppam Samayam (1984)
 Veendum Chalikkunna Chakram (1984)
 Himavahini (1983)
 Onnu Chirikku (1983)
 Pin Nilavu (1983)
 Rugma (1983)
 Sagaram Santham (1983)
 Sandhyakku Virinja Poovu (1983)
 Ithu Njangalude Katha (1982)
 Oru Thira Pinneyum Thira (1982)
 Idiyum Minnalum' (1981)
 Kadathu (1981)
 Sangharsham (1981)
 Sphodanam (1981) 
 Enne Snehikku Enne Mathrakm (1981)
 Greeshma Jwala (1981)
 Chaakara (1980)
 Kadalkkaattu (1980)
 Itha Oru Theeram (1979)
 Ivide Kattinu Sugandam (1979)
 Avar Jeevikkunnu (1978)
 Madhurikkunna Rathri (1978)
 Puthariyankam (1978)
 Pockettadikkari (1978)
 Seemanthini (1978)
 Satyavan Savithri (1977)
 Neeyente Lahari (1976)
 Ozhukkinethire'' (1976)
(LIST INCOMPLETE)

References

External links
 
 Janayugam article

Film directors from Thiruvananthapuram
Malayalam film directors
1941 births
2010 deaths
20th-century Indian film directors
21st-century Indian film directors